Air Vice Marshal Leigh Forbes Stevenson,  (24 April 1895 – March 1989) was a senior commander in the Royal Canadian Air Force during the Second World War. Early in the First World War he served in the trenches on the Western Front before becoming a pilot in the Royal Flying Corps. After the war he joined the fledgling Canadian Air Force. Stevenson remained in Air Force service when in 1924 the Royal Canadian Air Force was founded and served throughout the inter-war years.

On 16 October 1940 Stevenson was appointed Air Officer Commanding the RCAF in Great Britain (changed to Air Officer-in-Chief the RCAF in Great Britain on 6 November) at the RCAF Overseas Headquarters in London. In 1942 he returned to Canada to take command of Western Air Command. In 1946, he was elected to represent Vancouver-Point Grey in the Legislative Assembly of British Columbia as a member of the Coalition government; he served until 1952.

References

External links
A Century of Aviation in New Brunswick – Air Vice Marshal Leigh "Stevie" Stevenson

1895 births
1989 deaths
Canadian Expeditionary Force officers
Commanders of the Legion of Merit
Companions of the Order of the Bath
Royal Flying Corps officers
Royal Canadian Air Force air marshals of World War II